Turzovka is a town in the Čadca District, Žilina Region in north-western Slovakia.

History

The present-day town was established in 1598 by a palatine of the Thurzó family. It gained town status in 1968.

This town became well known by the Marian apparitions reported by Matúš Lašut between 1958 and 1962.

Geography
It lies in the Kysuca river valley, surrounded by the mountain ranges of Beskydy and Javorníky.

Demographics
According to the 2010 census, the town had 7,802 inhabitants. The largest minority group were Czech 0.75% and Roma 0.27%. The religious make-up was 92.74% Roman Catholics and 0.2% Lutherans, most of the others giving no affiliation.

Twin towns — sister cities

Turzovka is twinned with:
 Frýdlant nad Ostravicí, Czech Republic
 Győrújbarát, Hungary
 Kęty, Poland

References

External links 
 Town website
 Marian shrine website

 

Cities and towns in Slovakia
Villages and municipalities in Čadca District